Jinshi Town is an urban town and subdivision of Lianyuan, Hunan Province, People's Republic of China.

Administrative division
, the town administers 29 villages and 1 community: Shashi Community, Helian Village, Yanjiang Village, Shanmao Village, Baitan Village, Qili Village, Shuangtian Village, Daqiao Village, Jiangbian Village, Xieqiao Village, Huangshi Village, Qingchun Village, Guanxi Village, Longhe Village, Hehe Village, Damei Village, Xiaomei Village, Batangling Village, Yanling Village, Dikang Village, Bantian Village, Changlin Village, Huguang Village, Lashu'ao Village, Taolinba Village, Datangyuan Village, Hudong Village, Dongliping Village, Shuanghe Village, and Tongyi Village.

References

Divisions of Lianyuan